This is a list of New Zealand television events and premieres which occurred, or are scheduled to occur, in 2014, the 54th year of continuous operation of television in New Zealand.

Events 
13 January – TVNZ serial drama Shortland Street returns from its summer break, revealing the characters who died in the 2013 season finale.
14 January – It is announced that Trackside, the New Zealand horse racing channel, will no longer be aired on Freeview and will become a pay-per-view channel.
16 January – TVNZ reveal they will be airing the 2014 Grammy Awards on their free-to-air channels direct from the United States. A first for New Zealand free-to-air networks
3 February – Former TV3 reporter, Rachel Smalley, joins TVNZ current affairs show, Q+A
5 February – Sky Network Television announce they will no longer resell their services through Telecom.
8 February – After winning the broadcasting rights in 2013, Prime Television begins coverage of the 2014 Winter Olympics.
17 February – Television New Zealand unit manager, Shane Taurima resigns after it is revealed he took part in political conferences and allowed the opposition party (Labour) to use TVNZ facilities.
17 February – After a year on hiatus, the controversial reality show, The GC returns for a second season and begins airing on TV3 and funded by Te Mangai Paho.
19 February – Robert Rakete joins the Australian children's act, The Wiggles as the Brown Wiggle.
19 February – New Zealand actor, Charles Mesure joins the cast as Blackbeard in US television drama, Once Upon a Time alongside fellow New Zealander, Rose McIver (who plays Tinkerbell).
24 February – With the old UHF/VHF system being turned off in New Zealand in December 2013, Sky Television's profits increase by 22%
28 February – TVNZ reporter, Lisa Owen defects to TV3 to cohost The Nation.
9 March – MasterChef New Zealand contestants, Glynn and James, receive complaints regarding posts made on their Facebook page, however TVNZ releases a statement saying they have no control over Facebook or Twitter accounts made by contestants.
11 March – A Trademe.co.nz advert receives a complaint regarding the use and misinterpretation of the surname, "Ramsbottom" minutes are going live.
13 March – Actress Rose McIver is cast in upcoming US television based on a comic book series, iZombie
13 March – New Zealand On Air confirms that they will help fund a two part telemovie for cancelled television show, Nothing Trivial to give closure to the fans.
16 March – TV3 confirms that the next series of The Block NZ will be set on Newell Street in Auckland suburb, Point Chevalier
17 March – Chefs Ben Bayly and Gareth Stewart are confirmed as being the judges for new reality show, My Kitchen Rules NZ
17 March – In a controversial move, the Board for Māori Television push for former TVNZ Māori and Pacific unit general manager, Paora Maxwell to become CEO of the network.
17 March – Seven Sharp co-anchorman, Jesse Mulligan is confirmed as the new host for comedic television show, Best Bits, replacing comedian, Te Radar
21 March – Comedian Rhys Darby's mockumentary show, Short Poppies is confirmed to debut on Netflix in April 2014
22 March – English comedian Tony Robinson announces he will release a television series showing New Zealand war stories
23 March – After announcing when series three of The Block NZ will be based, residents of Point Chevalier's Newell Street unite to stop the shows production
24 March – Sommet Sports announcing they will be providing a satellite service on Freeview and Sky Television effective 14 April.
14 April – Sommet Sports begins airing on Sky Television
28 March – New Zealand television blogger, Chris Philpott retires from blogging after the birth of his first child.
30 March – Residents of the Auckland suburb, Point Chevalier, discover the houses in the next series of The Block NZ will be multistoried, much to their dismay.
1 April – Rhys Darby's parody television series, Short Poppies, becomes available in New Zealand on TVNZ On Demand.
1 April – Actor Temuera Morrison receives a $1.1 million grant from New Zealand on Air to fund a variety show.
26 April – TV Rotorua and Info Rotorua announcing they will be providing a satellite service on Freeview and Sky Television effective 26 April.
TBA – Prime also holds the rights to broadcast the 2014 Commonwealth Games in New Zealand.

Premieres

Domestic series

International series 

 *Due to low ratings, TV3 moved Hotel GB from its primetime slot to airing at 9.30am on Saturdays effective 22 February.

Telemovies and miniseries

Documentaries

Specials

Programming changes

Programmes changing networks 
Criterion for inclusion in the following list is that New Zealand premiere episodes will air in New Zealand for the first time on the new network. This includes when a program is moved from a free-to-air network's primary channel to a digital multi-channel, as well as when a program moves between subscription television channels – provided the preceding criterion is met. Ended television series which change networks for repeat broadcasts are not included in the list.

°Originally, The Michael J. Fox Show was shown as part of TV3's new line-up.  However, it has since been dropped by TV3 and was picked up and has begun airing on sister network, Four.

Free-to-air premieres
This is a list of programmes which made their premiere on New Zealand free-to-air television that had previously premiered on New Zealand subscription television. Programs may still air on the original subscription television network.

Subscription premieres
This is a list of programmes which made their premiere on New Zealand subscription television that had previously premiered on New Zealand free-to-air television. Programmes may still air on the original free-to-air television network.

Programmes returning in 2014

Milestone episodes in 2014

Programmes ending in 2014

Deaths

References